The Venezuela national ice hockey team is the national men's ice hockey team of Venezuela, and is controlled by the Venezuelan Ice and Inline Hockey Association, the governing body that oversees both ice and inline hockey in the country. Venezuela is not a member of the IIHF and therefore not eligible to enter any IIHF World Championship events.

History
There are only two notable players who were born in Venezuela are Rick Chartraw and Don Spring, who both played in the NHL. Chartraw played in the NHL for ten seasons between 1974 and 1984, most notably winning four Stanley Cups in a row with the Montreal Canadiens between 1976 and 1979, and one with the Edmonton Oilers in 1984, while Spring played for four season with the Winnipeg Jets between 1980 and 1984. Chartraw represented the United States at the 1976 Canada Cup, while Spring represented Canada at the 1980 Winter Olympics.

Venezuela made its debut in international competition in 2018 at the Amerigol LATAM Cup, sanctioned by the Amerigol International Hockey Association, which took place in Coral Springs, Florida, United States. The team played its first official game against Colombia on 9 November, falling to them 12–1. After an 0–3 start, they played their fourth game on 10 November and went on to win 5–3 against Brazil, eliminating them in the preliminary round and advanced to the Amerigol LATAM Cup semi-finals. The team once again played against Colombia on 11 November, but they were shutout by them 13–0, finishing in fourth place as the semi-finalist.

In the 2019 Amerigol LATAM Cup, the team won 8–4 against Chile and later won 5–3 against the Mexico Selects team. In the semi-finals, they lost 7–4 to Colombia and later in the bronze medal game, lost 3–2 to the Mexico Selects team, finishing in fourth place for the second straight year.

Tournament record

Amerigol LATAM Cup

Fixtures and results

All-time record against other national teams
Last match update: 26 March 2022

References

External links
Ice Hockey Venezuela 
Venezuela at National Teams of Ice Hockey

Ice hockey in Venezuela
National ice hockey teams in the Americas
Ice hockey